Pavlo Serhíyovych Kuznietsov (1 May 1950 – 27 January 2022) was a Ukrainian politician.

Biography
A member of the Communist Party of Ukraine, he served in the Verkhovna Rada from 1998 to 2002. 

Kuznietsov died of COVID-19 in Kyiv on 27 January 2022, at the age of 71.

References

1950 births
2022 deaths
20th-century Ukrainian politicians
21st-century Ukrainian politicians
Communist Party of the Soviet Union members
Communist Party of Ukraine politicians
Second convocation members of the Verkhovna Rada
Politicians from Taganrog
Deaths from the COVID-19 pandemic in Ukraine
Third convocation members of the Verkhovna Rada